Hossein Ghanbari (born February 20, 1988) is an Iranian football player. He currently plays for the IPL club Iranjavan bushehr as a midfielder.

At the beginning of his adolescence, he went to the youth team of Tehran Municipality, District 17, from the league game, and for playing, he turned his eyes to the Esteghlal Tehran base team. He is also proud to wear the national team jersey of the Islamic Republic of Iran در. Under the coaching of Amir Ghaleh Noei, he joined the Esteghlal senior team and played in several games in the Premier League and the elimination league. During the coaching of Nasser Hejazi and Firooz Karimi, he also played for Esteghlal Tehran in a few games. From the club where he played, to Bandar Anzali Sailors Football Club, Babol House-to-House Football Club, Esteghlal Tehran Football Club,, Mentioned Sarcheshmeh Copper Football Club of Kerman and Peykan Football Club of Tehran. He is currently playing in Bushehr Young Iran Football Club ...

Honours
Esteghlal
 Hazfi Cup: 2007–08

External links
Profile at Persianleague.com

1988 births
Living people
Esteghlal F.C. players
Malavan players
Iranian footballers
Association football midfielders

• Hossein Ghanbari on Instagram